George Bullen Shaw (March 12, 1854 – August 27, 1894) was a lumberman and U.S. Representative from Wisconsin.

Background 
Born in Alma, New York, Shaw moved to Eau Claire, Wisconsin in 1856 with his father.
He attended the public schools and graduated from the International Business College, Chicago, Illinois, in 1871. He engaged in the lumber manufacturing business. He served as Supreme Chancellor of the Knights of Pythias of the World from July 1890 to August 1892.

Public office 
He served as member of the Common Council of Eau Claire 1876–1887, and as mayor of Eau Claire in 1888 and 1889. He served as delegate to the Republican National Convention in 1884.

Shaw was elected as a Republican to the Fifty-third Congress representing Wisconsin's 7th congressional district serving from March 4, 1893, until his death in Eau Claire, Wisconsin, August 27, 1894. He was interred in Lake View Cemetery.

See also
List of United States Congress members who died in office (1790–1899)

References

1854 births
1894 deaths
Businesspeople from Wisconsin
People from Allegany County, New York
Wisconsin city council members
Republican Party members of the United States House of Representatives from Wisconsin
Mayors of Eau Claire, Wisconsin
19th-century American politicians
19th-century American businesspeople